Daniel Luke Shields III (born 1963) is a retired American Ambassador (Brunei 2011–2014). In 2017, he temporarily served as the Chargé d'affaires ad interim of the United States to ASEAN.  Prior to that, he joined the United States Army War College to act as diplomatic advisor since 2015. 

Ambassador Shields also served as Deputy Chief of Mission (2007-2010) at the U.S. Embassy in Singapore, and for over a year as Chargé d'Affaires (2009-2010), between the departure of Ambassador Patricia L. Herbold and the arrival of Ambassador David I. Adelman. Other overseas assignments included  Minister Counsellor for political at the U.S. Embassy in Beijing (2004-2007), Political Section Deputy, U.S. Embassy Tokyo (2002-2004), Principal Officer at U.S. Consulate Nagoya (1996-1999), Political Officer at U.S. Embassy Beijing (1991-1993), Political Officer at U.S. Embassy Tokyo (1987-1989), and Consular Officer at U.S. Embassy Manila (1985-1987).

Shields earned a Bachelor of Science degree in international relations from Georgetown University’s School of Foreign Service and a Master of Science from the National War College in 2001.

References

Ambassadors of the United States to Brunei
Ambassadors of the United States to ASEAN
Ambassadors of the United States to Singapore
National War College alumni
Walsh School of Foreign Service alumni
1963 births
Living people